Pirovano is an Italian surname. Notable people with the surname include:

Anton Maria Pirovano, Italian sculptor, painter and architect
Daisy Pirovano (born 1977), Italian politician
Fabrizio Pirovano (1960–2016), Italian motorcycle racer
Giovan Battista Pirovano (1937–2014), Italian footballer
Mario Pirovano (1950), Italian theatrical actor, storyteller, translator and interpreter 

Italian-language surnames
Surnames of Italian origin